Jack Felder (June 14, 1939 – December 3, 2017) was an American biochemist, research, lecturer, activist, educator, historian, and a germ warfare specialist. He was a self published author. He was a United States of America germ warfare specialist from 1962 to 1964 to the 5th Army Regiment in Chicago, Illinois.

Felder lectured about HIV and AIDS being man made.

Felder has written and researched the origins of the Statue of Liberty, and the history of Thanksgiving.

Felder worked for the New York City Public Schools and retired in 2001.

Felder lectured about African American oppression and the origin of HIV/AIDS.

Early life
 He was born in Columbia, South Carolina.
 1966 to 1970 - He received a Masters and a Doctorate degree in biochemistry from New York State University

Career
 1964 to 1966 Worked for the Natick Labs near Boston, Massachusetts.
 1966 to 1970 - He was a research scientist and translator at Siemens Firm in Berlin, Germany.

Self Published Books & Articles
 1986 - From the Statue of Liberty to the Statue of Bigotry
 1986 - AIDS–U.S. Germ Warfare at its Best with Documents and Proof
 1987 - Who Really Assassinated Dr. Martin Luther King" 
 1988 - Who Really Was Behind the Assassination of Malcolm X
 1990 - Black Origins and Lady Liberty which appeared in the Brooklyn Newspaper the 'Daily Challenge',
 He is also the author of, Should Afrikan People Celebrate Valentine’s Day

External links
DR JACK FELDER ON AIDS AS GERM WARFARE/ 1992 1 of 7
Rip Dr. Jack Felder
Rest In Power Dr. Jack Felder
Dr. Felder - Article
Origin of Aids.com
THE MANMADE ORIGIN OF AIDS By Admin and Dr. Kwame Nantambu
Aids and the Polio Vaccine Edward Hooper finds new evidence

Quotes
"I didn't learn that I was Gullah until I got to New York and started studying my true history. I learned that my people, the Gullah, are the Blackest and most pure Africans in America. I knew that when the slave master raped and impregnated our woman with half-caste children, we threw them babies in the Copper River. That's how we stayed so Black.

References

1939 births
2017 deaths
African-American scientists
People from Columbia, South Carolina
African-American writers
African-American activists
21st-century African-American people